Drillia ghyooti is a species of sea snail, a marine gastropod mollusc in the family Drilliidae.

Description
The shell of an adult shell varies between 10 mm and 17 mm.

Distribution
This marine species occurs off the Ivory Coast and São Tomé and Principe.

References

External links

ghyooti
Gastropods described in 2008